Leona Valley (Leona, Spanish for "Lioness") is a census-designated place located in the geographic Leona Valley of northern Los Angeles County, California, in the  transition between the Sierra Pelona Mountains and Mojave Desert, just west of Palmdale and the Antelope Valley. The population was 1,607 at the 2010 census.

Leona Valley is best known for its agriculture, particularly cherries and wine grapes. The town of Leona Valley holds its annual Leona Valley Cherry Festival in honor of its agricultural heritage.

Geography
Leona Valley town is located in its namesake, Leona Valley. This valley is a long narrow valley separated from the Antelope Valley by the San Andreas fault ridge, known as Ritter Ridge, so named after one of the settlers from Nebraska in the 1880s. The geographic Leona Valley is also home to the towns of Lake Hughes and Lake Elizabeth.

The ZIP Code is 93551 and the community is inside area code 661.

History
Leona Valley's post colonial history can be best described as land abundant with cattle ranches. In the late 18th century, after the loss of the Tataviam Native Americans  – the area's original inhabitants –  to Indian Reductions as Mission Indians at the Mission San Fernando immigrants from Spain and Mexico quickly established themselves. The majority of the immigrants were primarily interested in the land in order to establish cattle ranches. During the 1830s, the ranches were broken up into smaller homesteads by farmers from Germany, France and the state of Nebraska. The Ritter family started one of the first wineries in this country in Leona Valley which was later shut down by the U.S. Prohibition period in the early 20th century.

In 1901 Frank D Hall bought the 3000 acre St. Anthony Ranch. The valley was then known as Leonis and he changed the name of the ranch to Leona Valley Ranch and set about building a dairy farm.  The Ranch was most of the land west of Bouquet Canyon Rd.
The dairy did not work out and the subdivision of the Leona Valley Ranch started in 1918.  That first phase of the subdivision was for properties that had roads and water (either had water or was in an area known to be practical for drilling a well).  One of the early sales was the southwest corner of Elizabeth Lake Rd and 90th St West.  The Nolenberger's built a store and gas station on that lot which opened in 1924.  The building is now Hemme Hay and Feed store.  In 1927 Frank Hall incorporated Farm Home Builders to handle the next phase that required new roads and a water system.  To that end Farm Home Builders took out a loan for $45,000. The Great Depression hit before many sold and it wasn't until the 1940s that most were sold.

The majority of those old large homestead parcels have since been partially subdivided and developed with a mix of custom residences, with Leona Valley still maintaining a spacious beauty.

Businesses
Some local businesses that can be found in Leona Valley include Rancher's Market, a small convenience store, Jack's Place Which Opened July 4, 2015, Casa Gutierrez, The Dog House (pet grooming), Hemme Hay and Feed Store, an auto body shop, and a small antique store.

Demographics

The 2010 United States Census reported that Leona Valley had a population of 1,607. The racial makeup of Leona Valley was 1,456 (90.6%) White (82.9% Non-Hispanic White), 11 (0.7%) African American, 4 (0.2%) Native American, 28 (1.7%) Asian, 0 (0.0%) Pacific Islander, 51 (3.2%) from other races, and 57 (3.5%) from two or more races. Hispanic or Latino of any race were 198 persons (12.3%).

The Census reported that 1,607 people (100% of the population) lived in households, 0 (0%) lived in non-institutionalized group quarters, and 0 (0%) were institutionalized.

There were 590 households, out of which 182 (30.8%) had children under the age of 18 living in them, 394 (66.8%) were opposite-sex married couples living together, 27 (4.6%) had a female householder with no husband present, 23 (3.9%) had a male householder with no wife present.  There were 28 (4.7%) unmarried opposite-sex partnerships, and 5 (0.8%) same-sex married couples or partnerships. 114 households (19.3%) were made up of individuals, and 42 (7.1%) had someone living alone who was 65 years of age or older. The average household size was 2.72.  There were 444 families (75.3% of all households); the average family size was 3.16.

The population was spread out, with 335 people (20.8%) under the age of 18, 142 people (8.8%) aged 18 to 24, 247 people (15.4%) aged 25 to 44, 632 people (39.3%) aged 45 to 64, and 251 people (15.6%) who were 65 years of age or older.  The median age was 47.4 years. For every 100 females, there were 104.2 males.  For every 100 females age 18 and over, there were 106.2 males.

The homeowner vacancy rate was 4.1%; the rental vacancy rate was 13.8%.  1,412 people (87.9% of the population) lived in owner-occupied housing units and 195 people (12.1%) lived in rental housing units.

According to the 2010 United States Census, Leona Valley had a median household income of $79,375, with 8.1% of the population living below the federal poverty line.

Leona Valley AVA
The Reynolds Family Estate planted vineyards in 2001 and established Leona Valley Winery pioneering a new wine country with the Leona Valley AVA (American Viticulture Area) and a new L.A. County Wine Ordinance promoting wineries and tasting rooms in the area.

Government and infrastructure
The Los Angeles County Department of Health Services operates the Antelope Valley Health Center in Lancaster, serving Leona Valley.

References

External links

 Leona Valley Town Council website
 Leona Valley Cherry Growers Association
 Leona Valley Gymkhana
 Leona Valley Winery

Valleys of California
Populated places in the Mojave Desert
Census-designated places in Los Angeles County, California
Populated places established in 1922
Census-designated places in California
Valleys of Los Angeles County, California